Ryan Scott (born 22 February 1987 in Bristol) is an English sprint runner from Henleaze who competes in the 100 metres.

His first international appearances for Great Britain came in 2007. He ran in the 60 metres at the 2007 European Athletics Indoor Championships, but was disqualified in the final while his running mates Jason Gardener and Craig Pickering took gold and silver. In the summer he entered the 100 m at the 2007 European Athletics U23 Championships and recorded a personal best of 10.28 seconds in the heats. He did not make the final, however, as he was fifth in the semis.

In 2008 he set two new personal bests, running 6.59 seconds over 60 m and recording a mark of 10.20 seconds for the 100 m. He was selected as a relay 4x100 metres relay runner for the 2009 European Athletics U23 Championships and he started off the British team (including Toby Sandeman, Rion Pierre and Leevan Yearwood) which went on to secure the gold medal.

He won a gold medal in the 2010 Commonwealth Games in the 4 × 100 m relay race held in Delhi, India in October 2010. It was first senior international medal.  He competes domestically for Newham and Essex.

References

External links

Living people
1987 births
English male sprinters
British male sprinters
Commonwealth Games gold medallists for England
Athletes (track and field) at the 2010 Commonwealth Games
Black British sportsmen
Sportspeople from Bristol
Commonwealth Games medallists in athletics
Medallists at the 2010 Commonwealth Games